Sinmang-ri station is a railway station on the Gyeongwon Line in South Korea.

Railway stations in Gyeonggi Province